Amirul Aiman bin Ibrahim (born 22 September 2000) is a Malaysian footballer who plays as a midfielder.

References

External links
 

Living people
2000 births
Malaysian footballers
UiTM FC players
Malaysia Super League players
Association football midfielders